The England cricket team toured South Africa in the 1956–57 season. The tour was organised by the Marylebone Cricket Club and the side played five Test matches as "England" and 15 other first-class matches as "MCC". Two of the first-class matches took place in Rhodesia in what is now Zimbabwe.

England won the first two Test matches; the third was drawn; and South Africa won the final two games. The Test series was noted at the time for slow scoring, and England averaged 32.69 runs an hour in the series, while South Africa managed only 29.04.

England team
The MCC team was captained by Peter May, with Doug Insole as vice-captain. The former England Test captain Freddie Brown was the tour manager.

The full team was: 
Peter May; Doug Insole; Trevor Bailey; Denis Compton; Colin Cowdrey; Godfrey Evans (wicketkeeper); Jim Laker; Peter Loader; Tony Lock; Alan Oakman; Jim Parks junior; Peter Richardson; Brian Statham; Brian Taylor (wicketkeeper); Frank Tyson; Johnny Wardle

All of the players except Taylor had played in Test cricket before the tour. Oakman, Parks and Taylor did not play in any of Tests on the tour, and Taylor never appeared in Test cricket. Parks was injured soon after the tour began and flew back to the UK for treatment; he did not rejoin the tour and no replacement was sent for. The manager, Brown, appeared in one first-class match.

Test series summary

First Test

The match was noted for slow scoring, with Peter Richardson's 117 in England's first innings being at the time the slowest Test match century, taking eight hours and eight minutes to reach the 100. Richardson's 121-run fourth-wicket partnership with Colin Cowdrey was the highest of the match, Cowdrey making 59. No South African batsman reached 50, and Statham, Wardle and Bailey each took three wickets. England's second innings was also a struggle on a difficult pitch and South Africa were set 204 to win. With Tyson ill, Bailey opened the bowling with Statham and took five for 20 as South Africa were out for their lowest score in a home Test since 1898–99.

Second Test

On a slow pitch, England's opening pair of Richardson (45) and Bailey (34) started with 76, and then Compton made 58. But the major contribution to a big total was a sixth-wicket partnership of 93 between Cowdrey, who made 101 and Evans (62). As in the first Test, no South African batsman made 50. Wardle took five wickets for 53. Injuries to Neil Adcock and Clive van Ryneveld restricted South Africa to defensive bowling and fielding, but Compton (64) and Cowdrey (61) scored fast enough to allow May to declare, setting South Africa 385 to win in eight hours. They had little answer to Wardle, who took seven for 36 to finish with match figures of 12 for 89. In the South African second innings, Russell Endean was out handled the ball when he touched a ball that had flown upwards from his bat and threatened to fall on his stumps. It was the first time any batsman had been out in this manner in Test cricket.

Third Test

Richardson (68) and Bailey (80) opened with a stand of 115, during which they scored 103 runs in two hours before lunch on the first day. Thereafter, England surrendered the initiative, and Tayfield bowled 14 consecutive maidens, nine of them to Bailey. For South Africa, Tony Pithey, in his first Test, put on 65 with Trevor Goddard, who made 69, and then Roy McLean hit South Africa's only century of the series. The two first innings took until the tea interval on the third day. England were in trouble at 79 for three in the second innings with Bailey also injured, but Insole made 110 in six hours and 10 minutes and was not out when the innings ended. Hugh Tayfield's eight wickets for 69 runs in England's second innings was the best return by a South African bowler ever, beating the eight for 70 by Tip Snooke in 1905–06. Set 190 to win in four hours and 10 minutes, South Africa were unable to score quickly enough against accurate bowling and the match ended in a draw.

Fourth Test

Tayfield's record for the best bowling return by a South African in a Test match, set in the Third Test, lasted only three weeks. In England's second innings, he took nine for 113 with the final wicket a catch by his brother, Arthur, who was fielding as a substitute. South Africa had started well, with a second wicket stand of 112 between Goddard (67) and John Waite (61) before McLean made 93. May made his best score of the series, 61, and Insole and Compton passed 40, but South Africa led by 89. Goddard made 49 as South Africa lost cheap wickets, and England were set 232 to win with three-quarter of an hour plus a whole day to get them. Richardson (39), Insole (68) and Cowdrey (55) gave them hope, and at tea on the final day, England needed just 46 with four wickets remaining. But Tayfield, who bowled throughout the final day, took the lot with 17 runs to spare.

Fifth Test

This is the slowest Test in history, with scoring at a rate of 1.40 runs per six balls. A newly-laid pitch made batting difficult throughout, with unpredictable bounce and many balls that kept low. Endean made 70 in South Africa's first innings and that was by some distance the highest score of the match. Bailey made an uncharacteristically pugnacious 41, but only two other England batsmen reached doubled figures in the first innings. Tyson then took six for 40 in South Africa's second innings, but with runs difficult to obtain against the faster bowlers, Tayfield's off-spinners profited in England's second innings and his six for 78 gave him 37 wickets in the series, a record for a South African player. The match was Denis Compton's last Test.

References

External links
 England in South Africa, 1956-57 at Cricinfo
 England to South Africa 1956-57 at Test Cricket Tours

1956 in English cricket
1957 in English cricket
1956 in South African cricket
1957 in South African cricket
International cricket competitions from 1945–46 to 1960
1956-57
South African cricket seasons from 1945–46 to 1969–70